This list of California beaches is a list of beaches that are situated along the coastline of the State of California, USA.

North to South
The beaches are listed in order from north to south, and are grouped by county. The list includes all of the California State Beaches, but not all other beaches are listed here. In some cases (as indicated), more detailed list articles of beaches are available for certain areas of the coast, currently for Sonoma County and San Diego County.

Del Norte County 
 Pelican State Beach
 Crescent Beach
 Redwood National Park
 Prairie Creek Redwoods State Beach

Humboldt County 
 Humboldt Lagoons State Park
 Sue-meg State Park
 Trinidad State Beach
 Little River State Beach
 Clam Beach County Park
 Sinkyone Wilderness State Park

Mendocino County 
 Westport-Union Landing State Beach
 MacKerricher State Park
 Caspar Headlands State Beach
 Russian Gulch State Park
 Manchester State Park
 Schooner Gulch State Beach
 Glass Beach (Fort Bragg, California)

Sonoma County 

Numbers in parentheses are Geographic Names Information System feature ids.

Sonoma County ocean beaches
Coastal beaches, listed from north to south:

 Gualala Point Regional Park 
 Sea Ranch, California:
 Walk-On Beach 
 Shell Beach 
 Stengle Beach 
 Pebble Beach 
 Black Point Beach 
 Salt Point State Park:
 Stump Beach 
 Stillwater Cove Regional Park
 Fort Ross State Historic Park:
 Clam Beach 
 Sonoma Coast State Beach:
 Goat Rock Beach 
 Blind Beach 
 Shell Beach 
 Wrights Beach 
 Gleason Beach 
 Portuguese Beach 
 Schoolhouse Beach
 Carmet Beach 
 Arched Rock Beach 
 Coleman Beach 
 Miwok Beach 
 North Salmon Creek Beach 
 South Salmon Creek Beach 
 Doran Regional Park:
 Doran Beach 
 Pinnacle Gulch

Sonoma County inland (river) beaches
 On the Russian River:
 Monte Rio Public Beach, in Monte Rio
 Vacation Beach
 Johnson's Beach, Guerneville
 Steelhead Beach Regional Park 
 Healdsburg Veterans Memorial Beach

Marin County 
 Tomales Bay State Park
 Point Reyes National Seashore
 Mount Tamalpais State Park
 Stinson Beach Park
 Golden Gate National Recreation Area
Dillon beach
Muir Beach

Contra Costa County
 Miller/Knox Beach

Alameda County
 Albany Beach
 Radio Beach
 Crown Memorial State Beach

San Francisco County 
San Francisco Bay
 Aquatic Park
 Golden Gate National Recreation Area – includes
 East Beach

Pacific Ocean

Marshall's Beach

Baker Beach

China Beach

Lands End Beach

Ocean Beach

Golden Gate National Recreation Area - includes

Fort Funston Beach

San Mateo County
 Thornton Beach State Park
 Palisades Park
 Northridge Park
 Mussel Rock Park
 Long View Park
 Beach State Park
 Rockaway Beach
 Tunitas Creek Beach
 Gray Whale Cove State Beach
 Montara State Beach
 El Granada Beach
 Vallejo Beach
 Miramar Beach
 Half Moon Bay State Beach, which includes:
 Roosevelt Beach (also known as Naples Beach)
 Dunes Beach
 Venice Beach
 Elmar Beach
 Francis Beach
 Poplar Beach
 Redondo State Beach
 Pelican Point Beach
 Cowell Ranch Beach
 Martins Beach
 San Gregorio Private Beach
 San Gregorio State Beach
 Pomponio State Beach
 Pescadero State Beach
 Pebble Beach
 Bean Hollow State Beach
 Pigeon Point Beach
 Año Nuevo State Park
 Gazos Creek State Beach
 Scaroni Road beach

Santa Cruz County 
 Natural Bridges State Beach
 Mitchell's Cove Beach
 Lighthouse Field State Beach
 Santa Cruz Beach
 Twin Lakes State Beach
 Capitola State Beach
 Seacliff State Beach
 Manresa State Beach
 New Brighton State Beach
 Sunset State Beach

Monterey County 
 Asilomar State Beach
 Carmel Beach City Park
 Carmel River State Beach
 John Little State Reserve
 Julia Pfeiffer Burns State Park
 Marina State Beach
 Monterey State Beach
 Pacific Grove
 Del Monte Beach
 San Carlos Beach
 Cabrillo Beach
 Lover's Point Beach
 Sunset Beach
 Moss Landing State Beach
 Pebble Beach
 Point Lobos State Reserve
 Point Sur Lightstation State Historic Park
 Salinas River State Beach
 Sand Dollar Beach
 Zmudowski State Beach

San Luis Obispo County 
 William Randolph Hearst Memorial State Beach
 Estero Bluffs State Park
 Cayucos State Beach
 Morro Bay
 Morro Strand State Beach
 Morro Rock Beach 
 Morro Bay State Park
 Montaña de Oro State Park
 Ávila Beach
 Pismo State Beach

Santa Barbara County 

 Rancho Guadalupe Dunes County Park
 Point Sal State Beach
 Surf Beach
 Jalama Beach County Park
 Jack and Laura Dangermond Preserve
 Hollister Ranch
 Gaviota State Park
 Refugio State Beach
 El Capitán State Beach
 Santa Barbara Shores County Park
 Goleta Beach Park
 Arroyo Burro Beach
 Leadbetter Beach
 West Beach
 East Beach
 Butterfly Beach
 Lookout County Park
 Carpinteria State Beach
 Rincon Beach Park

Ventura County 
 Emma Wood State Beach
 Ventura
 San Buenaventura State Beach / Ventura Beach
 Harbor Cove Beach
 McGrath State Beach
 Mandalay State Beach
 Oxnard Beach Park
 Channel Islands Beach
 Silver Strand Beach
 Port Hueneme Beach Park
 Point Mugu State Park
 County Line Beach

Los Angeles County 
Leo Carrillo State Park
Robert Meyer Memorial State Beach
El Pescador State Beach
La Piedra State Beach
El Matador State Beach
Lechuza Beach
Broad Beach
Zuma Beach
Point Dume State Beach
Malibu Lagoon State Beach
Topanga State Beach
Will Rogers State Beach
Sorrento Beach
Santa Monica State Beach
Venice City Beach (Venice, California)
Charlie Beach
Playa Del Rey
Dockweiler State Beach
El Segundo Beach
El Porto Beach
Manhattan Beach County Park
Hermosa City Beach
Redondo Beach
 Redondo Beach State Park
 Avenue H Beach
 Burnout Beach
Torrance County Beach (Torrance, California)
RAT Beach
Royal Palms State Beach
White Point Beach
Cabrillo Beach Park
Long Beach
 Long Beach City Beach
 Rosie's Dog Beach
 Alamitos Bay
 Bayshore Beach
 Marine Stadium Reserve / Mother's Beach

Orange County 
 Seal Beach
 Surfside Beach
 Sunset Beach
 Bolsa Chica State Beach
 Huntington City Beach
 Huntington State Beach
 Santa Ana River County Beach
 Newport
 Newport Municipal Beach
 10th St Beach 
 19th St Bay Beach
 Newport Dunes
 Bay Back Beach
 North Star Beach
 East Beach on Bay Island
 Balboa Beach
 West Jetty View Park
 Bayside Drive County Beach
 China Cove Beach
 Rocky Point
 Corona del Mar State Beach
 Little Corona del Mar Beach
 Crystal Cove State Park
 Crescent Bay Point Park
 Shaw's Cove
 Diver's Cove
 Rockpile Beach
 Picnic Beach
 Main Beach
 Brooks Beach
 Victoria Beach
 Laguna Beach
 Aliso Creek County Beach
 West Street Beach
 1,000 Steps Beach
 Salt Creek County Beach
 Doheny State Beach
 Capistrano Beach
 Poche Beach
 Komo Beach
 San Clemente City Beach
 San Clemente State Beach

San Diego County

State beaches
California State Beaches are beaches designated as such by the California Department of Parks and Recreation. State beaches are part of the California State Parks system.

For a more detailed list beaches in the San Diego area, see List of beaches in San Diego, California.

See also
 List of beaches in the United States

References

Lists of beaches of the United States
Beaches
Pacific Ocean-related lists